Green Party leadership election may refer to:

2001 Green Party of Ontario leadership election 
2005 Green Party (Czech Republic) leadership election 
2006 Green Party of Canada leadership election
2007 Green Party (Czech Republic) leadership election 
2008 Green Party leadership election (disambiguation)
2009 Green Party (Czech Republic) leadership election
2009 Green Party of Ontario leadership election 
2010 Green Party (Czech Republic) leadership election 
2010 Green Party of England and Wales leadership election 
2012 Green Party leadership election (disambiguation), any of several Green Party leadership elections in 2012
2013 Green Party of Quebec leadership election
2014 Green Party (Czech Republic) leadership election
2014 Green Party of England and Wales leadership election 
2015 Green Party of Aotearoa New Zealand male co-leadership election
2015 Green Party (Czech Republic) leadership election 
2016 Green Party leadership election (disambiguation)
2017 Green League leadership election in Finland 
2018 Green Party leadership election (disambiguation), any of several Green Party leadership elections in 2018
2019 Scottish Greens co-leadership election
2020 Green Party leadership election (disambiguation), any of several Green Party leadership elections in 2020
2021 Green Party of Aotearoa New Zealand male co-leadership election
2021 Green Party of England and Wales leadership election
2022 Green Party leadership election (disambiguation), any of several Green Party elections taking place in 2022